Nephele (minor planet designation: 431 Nephele) is a large Themistian asteroid. It is spectral C-type and is probably composed of carbonaceous material.

It was discovered by Auguste Charlois on 18 December 1897 in Nice.

References

External links 
 
 

000431
000431
Discoveries by Auguste Charlois
Named minor planets
000431
000431
18971218